Robel Kiros Habte (born 13 April 1992 in Adama, Ethiopia) is an Ethiopian swimmer. He holds the Ethiopian championship records in a 100m butterfly, 50m, and 100m freestyle. He represented Ethiopia in competitions held in Morocco, Singapore, Qatar, Mozambique, Spain, Russia and Brazil, from youth Olympic games to Olympics. He competed in the 100-metre freestyle event at the 2016 Summer Olympics. He served as the flag bearer for Ethiopia at the 2016 Summer Olympics Parade of Nations. 

Habte is a son of Kiros Habte Kinfe, president of Ethiopian Swimming Federation.

Career best times

References

External links 

1992 births
Living people
Ethiopian male swimmers
Olympic swimmers of Ethiopia
Swimmers at the 2016 Summer Olympics
Place of birth missing (living people)
Swimmers at the 2010 Summer Youth Olympics